Leonardo Rodrigues Pereira or simply Leonardo (born September 22, 1986) is a Brazilian professional footballer. Leonardo usually plays as an attacking midfielder but can also play as a winger.

Club career
Leonardo was born in Vila Velha, Brazil.

On July 30, 2009, Leonardo signed a five-year contract with AEK Athens. On August 20, Leonardo made his official debut for AEK, in the game versus Vaslui in the Europa League. Leonardo made his league debut in the 1–0 away win over Atromitos on August 30.  He scored his first goal for AEK on December 6, against Panionios.

In the Greek playoffs home 4–2 win against Aris, Leonardo came in as a substitute in the 51st minute and scored twice. AEK's next fixture was facing Aris again, held in Kleanthis Vikelidis Stadium. The score was 1–0 against AEK, and Leonardo (who had also come in as a substitute that match) made the score 1–1 and equalized in injury time, giving AEK an invaluable point. In the 2011–12 season, he played in 26 matches scoring 9 goals, and was the club top scorer in the league.

Personal life
Leonardo is married to Kamilla Fiorese Da Silva, and the couple has two daughters. Leonardo, who moved to Greece at the age of 18, speaks fluent Greek.

Career statistics

Club
.

Honours
AEK Athens
Greek Cup: 2010–11

Jeonbuk Hyundai Motors
K League Classic: 2014, 2015
AFC Champions League: 2016

Al Jazira Club
UAE Arabian Gulf League: 2016–17

Individual
K League Best XI: 2013, 2016

References

External links
 
 

1986 births
Living people
People from Vila Velha
Sportspeople from Espírito Santo
Association football midfielders
Brazilian footballers
Brazilian expatriate footballers
Thrasyvoulos F.C. players
Levadiakos F.C. players
AEK Athens F.C. players
Jeonbuk Hyundai Motors players
Super League Greece players
Al Jazira Club players
Al Nassr FC players
Tianjin Tianhai F.C. players
Shandong Taishan F.C. players
Al Dhafra FC players
K League 1 players
UAE Pro League players
Saudi Professional League players
Chinese Super League players
Brazilian expatriate sportspeople in Greece
Brazilian expatriate sportspeople in South Korea
Brazilian expatriate sportspeople in the United Arab Emirates
Brazilian expatriate sportspeople in Saudi Arabia
Brazilian expatriate sportspeople in China
Expatriate footballers in Greece
Expatriate footballers in South Korea
Expatriate footballers in the United Arab Emirates
Expatriate footballers in Saudi Arabia
Expatriate footballers in China